Stahl Creek is a stream in Lawrence County of southwest Missouri.

The stream headwaters arise just north of Heatonville and Missouri Route 96. the waters flow to the west passing under Missouri Route 39 just north of Albatross and south of Miller. The stream turns southwest passing under Route 96 and on bordering the southeast margin of the Robert E. Talbot Conservation Area to join the Spring River northwest of Mount Vernon.

Stahl Creek has the name of the local Stahl family.

See also
List of rivers of Missouri

References

Rivers of Lawrence County, Missouri
Rivers of Missouri